The San Mateo Daily News was a free daily newspaper in San Mateo, California published 6 days a week with an average daily circulation of 22,000. The newspaper was founded August 9, 2000 by Dave Price (journalist) and Jim Pavelich, who also published the Palo Alto Daily News. Both papers were distributed in large red newspaper racks and inside stores, coffee shops, restaurants, schools, and major workplaces. The San Mateo Daily News, along with five other Daily News editions, was sold to Knight Ridder on February 15, 2005. After McClatchy's acquisition of Knight Ridder in 2006, all six Daily News editions, including the San Mateo Daily News were bundled with the San Jose Mercury News and sold to MediaNews Group of Denver, Colorado. The surviving Daily News, papers merged on April 7, 2009.

External links
 Knight Ridder buys Daily News
 Daily News publishers ride into sunset

MediaNews Group publications
San Mateo, California
Defunct newspapers published in California
Daily newspapers published in the San Francisco Bay Area
Newspapers established in 2000
Publications disestablished in 2009
2000 establishments in California
2009 disestablishments in California